Chittenden Lake is a lake in Madera County, California, in the United States.

Chittenden Lake was named for Corynne and Bob Chittenden of Fresno, California.

See also
List of lakes in California

References

Lakes of California
Lakes of Madera County, California
Lakes of Northern California